Emil Bollhalder is a retired Swiss sidecarcross rider and double Sidecarcross World Champion, having won the competition in 1982 and 1983, together with his passenger Karl Büsser. He has also won the European Champions, the predecessor of the World Championship, in 1979, the last running of the competition.

Apart from his World and European Championship triumphs he has also won the Swiss national sidecarcross championship twice, in 1982 and 1983.

Biography
Emil Bollhalder made his debut in national and international sidecarcross in 1974. He successfully raced in the Swiss championship, finishing runners-up as well as in the FIM-Cup, the predecessor of the European Championship, where he came tenth. In both competitions he used Ruedi Kasper as his passenger.

From 1975 he switched to Roland Bollhalder as his passenger, who he would race with, except for a brief interruption in 1976 until the end of the 1979 season. In this era, the Bollhalder's achieved good results in the Swiss championship but were unable to better Robert Grogg at the time, who dominated the national competition. Internationally, the situation was similar with the duo always finishing high in the top ten of the competition now renamed European Championship. There however the duo experienced some success in 1979, being able to outscore Robert Grogg and his passenger Andreas Hüsser and winning the last edition of the European Championship.

The first season of the new World Championship proved unsuccessful for Bollhalder, now with new passenger Ruedi Manser. The new team took part in only two events this season and came 24th overall. In the Swiss championship they did not compete at all that year.

For 1981 he switched passengers again, now riding with Karl Büsser for the most part of the season. With Büsser results improved and the new team came second in Switzerland and fourth in the World Championship.

The 1982 and 1983 seasons were dominated by the team of Bollhalder and Büsser, both nationally and internationally. The two won the Swiss championship in both years, as they did the World Championship. In the later, on both occasions, they relegated the German team of Josef Brockhausen and Hubert Rebele to second place, by 62 points in 1982 and 11 points in 1983.

Emil Bollhalder retired from national and international competition after the end of the 1983 season, as did Karl Büsser.

Racing record

Sidecarcross World Championship
The competition which was to become the Sidecarcross World Championship in 1980 originated as the FIM Cup in 1971 and was renamed to European championship in 1975. Emil Bollhalder's results in these competitions were:.

Honours

World Championship
 Champions: (2) 1982, 1983

European Championship
 Champions: (1) 1979

National Championships
 Swiss national championship: 
 Champions: (2) 1982, 1983
 Runners-up: (4) 1974, 1977, 1978, 1981

References

External links
 The World Championship on Sidecarcross.com

Living people
Swiss sidecarcross riders
Year of birth missing (living people)